Thừa Thiên Huế is a province in the North Central Coast region of Vietnam, approximately in the center of the country. It borders Quảng Trị province to the north, Quảng Nam province and Đà Nẵng to the south, Laos to the west and the East Sea to the east. The province has 128 km of coastline, 22,000 ha of lagoons and over 200,000 ha of forest. There is an extensive complex of imperial tombs and temples in Huế.

History
The region's history dates back some 20,800 years according to archaeological findings from the Sa Huynh Culture as well as from relics in the region. Đại Việt became an independent nation around 938 AD of which territorial conflict lasts for about four centuries between the Đại Việt and the Champa. The two provinces then changed their names to Thanh and Hóa. In 1307, Đoàn Nhữ Hài was appointed by the emperor, Trần Anh Tông, to administer the area. The people from the north (Thanh Hóa) migrated south and integrated with the people of the Kingdom of Champa. During this time, had the settlement of Hoa Chau province began, which included the area of present-day Thừa Thiên.

Between the settlement of Thuận Hóa (1306) to the founding of Phú Xuân (1687), there were conflicts and uncertainties for the local people, which including the fall of the Trần Dynasty to the renaissance of the Hồ dynasty. Thuận Hóa and Phú Xuân became the location of the Đại Việt kingdom once Nguyễn Hoàng was appointed head of Thuận Hóa (1511–1558). The Nguyễn lords ruled the area until it tookn over the Trinh clan in 1775. The farmers' movement led by the Tây Sơn brothers gained momentum in 1771. The Tây Sơn insurgent army won the battle in Phú Xuân to take over the Nguyễn capital in 1786, where they continued north and overthrew the Trinh Dynasty. In Phú Xuân, Nguyễn Huệ appointed himself king, and with internal differences with the Tây Sơn Movement and the death of Nguyễn Huệ (1792), Nguyễn Ánh took advantage of the situation and took over Gia Định with the support of foreign forces. Nguyễn Ánh attached to the Tây Sơn movement and took over Phú Xuân and the throne, thereby choosing the dynasty title of Gia Long (1802). Phú Xuân was again chosen as the capital of Vietnam until 1945's August Revolution. Prior to 1975, the province was known simply as Thừa Thiên.

The province is known as an area of heavy fighting during the Vietnam War, as it was the second-most northerly province of the South Vietnam, close to the North Vietnamese border (DMZ) at the 17th parallel. More U.S. soldiers died in this province than in any other province in Vietnam (2,893). The Massacre at Huế occurred here; an estimated 2,800 to 6,000 civilians and Army of the Republic of Vietnam (ARVN) prisoners of war (POWs) were slaughtered by the Việt Cộng. Thừa Thiên Huế province saw a large influx of North Vietnamese settlers soon after the Vietnam War ended, as with the rest of the former South. This province and neighbouring Quảng Nam province suffered greatly from flooding in November 1999.

Geography
Thừa Thiên Huế province borders Quảng Trị province to the north, the city of Đà Nẵng to the east, Quảng Nam province to the south, and the Savannakhet, Salavan and Sekong provinces of Laos to the west. The Perfume River (called Sông Hương or Hương Giang in Vietnamese) passes through the province. The province comprises four different zones: a mountainous area, hills, plains and lagoons separated from the sea by sandbanks. It has  of beaches. Between the hills are the lagoons which occupy the remaining five per cent of the province's surface area.

Bạch Mã National Park is a protected area near the city of Hué. The climate is similar to central Vietnam in general: a tropical monsoon climate. The cool season is from November to March with cold northeasterly winds. The lowest average monthly temperature is in January: . It is very humid in July but relative humidity is lower, sometimes down to 50 per cent.

The annual precipitation in the province is  but there are important variations. The rainy season is from September to December—about 70 per cent of the precipitation occurring in those months. Rainfall often occurs in short heavy bursts which can cause flooding and erosion, with serious social, economic and environmental consequences. The floods of November 1999 led to 600 deaths and affected 600,000 homes. (Comité des inondations, 1999).

Flora and fauna
A remote region known as the "Green Corridor" is home to many species. New species of snake, butterfly, and orchid have been found there in 2005 and 2006, as stated by Chris Dickinson of the World Wide Fund for Nature (WWF) on 26 September 2007. The scientists discovered 11 new species of plants and animals, including a snake, two butterflies and five leafless orchid varieties. The new snake species is a white-lipped keelback (Hebius leucomystax). The new butterfly species are a skipper from the genus  Zela and the other from Satyrinae. The new plant species also include one in the genus Aspidistra, and a poisonous Arum perennial.

Administrative divisions
Thừa Thiên Huế is subdivided into 9 district-level sub-divisions:

 6 districts:

 A Lưới
 Nam Đông
 Phong Điền
 Phú Lộc
 Phú Vang
 Quảng Điền

 2 district-level towns:

 Hương Thủy
 Hương Trà

 1 provincial city:
 Huế (capital)

They are further subdivided into 8 commune-level towns (or townlets), 105 communes, and 39 wards.

Demographics

The average population of the province is 1.143.572, which consist of approximately 567.253 males and 576.319 females. The rural population is approximately 587.516 while the urban population is 556.056 (2015).

Economy
The retail sales of goods and services (trade, hotel, restaurant, tourism) in the province is 10960.6 billion đồng or 0.9 percent of the country. This is compared with 12.7 percent for Hanoi and 23.5 percent for Ho Chi Minh City (2009). The province has more than 120 km of coastline, which provides for a seafood industry that produces over 40,000 tonnes/year consisting of over 500 species of fish.

There are more than 100 mines for minerals and non-mineral resources with the majority consisting of limestone, granite and kaolin. Arts (e.g. wood works, fabrics, furnitures, paper arts, pottery), literature (text books), and spicy cuisines (included dry goods, vegetarian food) are the main exports of this region. Exquisite custom-made áo dài (Vietnamese long dress), and nón lá (conical hat) are souvenir items for foreign visitors and overseas Vietnamese. The ability to make toys, design lanterns, form special papers, and figurine-making are native skills. Such fruits as rambutan, jackfruit, lychee, durian, dao, dragon fruit, star fruit, mangosteen, coconut, and kumquat are grown in this area due to sufficient amount of rain received each year.

Many historical buildings are located in Huế, largely a legacy from its time as a capital of the Nguyễn dynasty (1802–1945), including the Royal Citadel, the Flag Tower, the Royal Palace, and the Royal Tombs. Huế's Forbidden Purple City was once reserved for the royal family, but was severely damaged during the Vietnam War. Outside the city is the religious site known as Nam Giao Hill ("Heaven's Altar"). Hue Brewery Ltd is located on Hương Giang in Huế with a recognizable brand in central Vietnam. The Brewery is jointed owned by the state and private sector and was founded in 1990 with an initial investment of US$2.4 million with a capacity of 3 million liters/year, which has grown to a capacity of 100 million liters/year in 2007.

Transportation
Vietnam's National Route 1, which runs the entire length of the nation from north to south, passes through Huế. Huế and Đà Nẵng are the main intermediate stops on the railway line from Hanoi to Ho Chi Minh City. This province is served by two sea ports: Thuan An Port and Chân Mây Port. Phu Bai International Airport, the largest domestic airport in terms of passengers per year is situated 15 km south of Huế. This airport ranks fourth among Vietnam's airports. The government has approved the upgrade of this airport to an international airport with some air links inside Asia.

Education

This city is home to Huế University (e.g.: Huế Economic University, Huế Medicine University, Huế Pedagogical University, Huế Forestry and Agriculture University, Huế University of Sciences, Huế University of Arts, Huế Conservatory of Music and Huế College of Foreign Languages). As of 2009 the province had 190 schools, 1302 classrooms, 2184 teachers and 36,200 pupils.

The most famous high school in Thua Thien Hue province is Quốc Học – Huế High School for the Gifted. It is well known for its high quality of education. Besides, its reputation comes from its ancient structure of France.

Notable residents
Thích Nhất Hạnh, Buddhist monk
Trịnh Công Sơn, composer
Ngô Viết Thụ, architect
Ho Ngoc Ha, singer and actress

Etymology
The province's name derives from Sino-Vietnamese 承天順化.

References

External links

 
North Central Coast
Gulf of Tonkin
Provinces of Vietnam